James Rutherfoord Worsfold Thomson (20 July 1923 – 1 December 2008), known professionally as James Bree, was a British actor who appeared on stage, and played many supporting roles in both film and television.

Bree was educated at Radley College near Abingdon, Oxfordshire and during the Second World War served in the RAF. He later trained at the Central School of Speech and Drama. He changed his surname to Thomson-Bree after inheriting land from his great-uncle, Archdeacon William Bree.

On stage, Bree was in the original productions of Thornton Wilder's The Matchmaker in London's West End in 1954; and in John Arden's Sergeant Musgrave's Dance at the Royal Court in 1959. He was also one of the founder members of Peter Hall's Royal Shakespeare Company at Stratford in 1960.

On screen, he was cast as Blofeld's attorney Gumbold in the 1969 James Bond film On Her Majesty's Secret Service, and for his role as Uncle Arthur in The Jewel in the Crown.

Bree performed three roles in the original series of Doctor Who. He played the Security Chief in the 1969 Patrick Troughton story The War Games, Nefred in the 1980 Tom Baker story Full Circle and Keeper of the Matrix in the 1986 Colin Baker story The Ultimate Foe.

He died in December 2008, aged 85, after a long illness.

Filmography

Film
 Just My Luck (1957) - Ford (uncredited)
 Never Let Go (1960) - Orders Clerk
 A Matter of Choice (1963) - Alfred
 Who Was Maddox? (1964) - Reynolds
 On Her Majesty's Secret Service (1969) - Gebrüder Gumbold
 Satan's Slave (1976) - Malcolm Yorke 
 The Odd Job (1978) - Mr. Kemp
 On the Black Hill (1988) - Colonel Bickerton
 Without a Clue  (1988) - Barrister

Television

 The Avengers (1963-1968) - Arthur Wilkington / Miller
 Z-Cars (1964-1972) - Smedley / Mr. Hodge / Tim Duncan
 R3 (1965) - Professor Chernev
 The Prisoner (1967) - Villers
 The Troubleshooters (1967-1968) - Winbush / Jack Lang
 The First Lady (1968) - Richard Pettifer
 Doctor Who (1969-1986) - Security Chief / Nefred / Keeper of the Matrix
 Randall and Hopkirk (1969) - Mullet, the InnKeeper
 Codename (1970) - Meyer
 Doctor at Large (1971) - Mr. Gilbert
 The Persuaders! (1971) - Bill Wilton
 Upstairs, Downstairs (1971) - Sir Adam
 The Shadow of the Tower (1972) - The Priest
 Ace of Wands (1972) - Matilda Edgington / The Major
 Special Branch (1973)
 Looking For Clancy (1975) - Guy Wall
 Madame Bovary (1975) - Beadle
 Hadleigh (1976) - Robert Marshall
 I, Claudius (1976) - Montanus
 The Duchess of Duke Street (1976) - Ross
 Rising Damp (1977) - Peppery Man
 Secret Army (1977) - Gaston Colbert
 The Sweeney (1978) - Saxby
 All Creatures Great and Small (1978-1988) - Humphrey Cobb / Mr. Plenderleith
 The Professionals (1978) - Grant
 Rumpole of the Bailey (1979) - Mr Glassworth
 The Jewel in the Crown (1984) - Uncle Arthur
 The Return of Sherlock Holmes (1986) - Coroner
 Silent Witness (1996) - Brewer

References

External links
 

1923 births
2008 deaths
Alumni of the Royal Central School of Speech and Drama
English male stage actors
English male film actors
English male television actors
People educated at Radley College
Royal Air Force personnel of World War II